Lauren Horton (born July 21, 1995) is a Canadian curler from Pakenham, Ontario.

Youth career
Horton's Huntley Curling Club rink won the 2011 provincial bantam championship. This qualified her team to represent Ontario at the 2011 Canada Winter Games, where she would take home the bronze medal. She won the provincial junior mixed championship in 2014, throwing third stones for Ryan McCrady. While attending Carleton University, Horton won the 2014 CIS/CCA Curling Championships playing third for the Carleton Ravens team, skipped by Jamie Sinclair. The team represented Canada at the 2015 Winter Universiade, with Sinclair replaced by Breanne Meakin from the University of Manitoba (Sinclair had committed to curling for the United States at this point). The team would end up winning the silver medal.

Women's career
Horton joined the Susan Froud rink in 2017, throwing third rocks for the team. She won her first World Curling Tour event as a member of the team at the 2017 Stroud Sleeman Cash Spiel. The team qualified for the 2019 Ontario Scotties Tournament of Hearts, Horton's first provincial women's championship. There, Horton took over as the team's skip.

Personal life
Horton attended Almonte District High School.

References

External links

Living people
1995 births
Canadian women curlers
Curlers from Ontario
Universiade medalists in curling
Carleton University alumni
People from Almonte, Ontario
Universiade silver medalists for Canada
Competitors at the 2015 Winter Universiade